A slide show (slideshow) is a presentation of a series of still images (slides) on a projection screen or electronic display device, typically in a prearranged sequence. The changes may be automatic and at regular intervals or they may be manually controlled by a presenter or the viewer. Slide shows originally consisted of a series of individual photographic slides projected onto a screen with a slide projector. When referring to the video or computer-based visual equivalent, in which the slides are not individual physical objects.

A slide show may be a presentation of images purely for their own visual interest or artistic value, sometimes unaccompanied by description or text, or it may be used to clarify or reinforce information, ideas, comments, solutions or suggestions which are presented verbally. Slide shows are sometimes still conducted by a presenter using an apparatus such as a carousel slide projector or an overhead projector, but now the use of an electronic video display device and a computer running presentation software is typical.

History
Slide shows had their beginnings in the 1600s, when hand-painted images on glass were first projected onto a wall with a "magic lantern". By the late 1700s, showmen were using magic lanterns to thrill audiences with seemingly supernatural apparitions in a popular form of entertainment called a phantasmagoria. Sunlight, candles and oil lamps were the only available light sources. The development of new, much brighter artificial light sources opened up a world of practical applications for image projection. In the 1800s, a series of hand-painted glass "lantern slides" was sometimes projected to illustrate story-telling or a lecture. Widespread and varied uses for amusement and education evolved throughout the century. By 1900, photographic images on glass had replaced hand-painted images, but the black-and-white photographs were sometimes hand-colored with transparent dyes. The production of lantern slides had become a considerable industry, with dimensions standardized at 3.25 inches high by 4 inches wide in the US and 3.25 inches square in the UK and much of Europe.

"Magic lantern shows" also served as a form of home entertainment and were especially popular with children. They continued to have a place among commercial public amusements even after the coming of projected "moving pictures". Between films, early movie theaters often featured "illustrated songs", which were community sing-alongs with the lyrics and illustrations provided by a series of projected lantern slides. Theaters also used their lanterns to project advertising slides and messages such as "Ladies, kindly remove your hats".

After 35 mm Kodachrome color film was introduced in 1936, a new standard 2×2 inch (5×5 cm) miniature lantern slide format was created to better suit the very small transparencies the film produced. In advertising, the antique "magic lantern" terminology was streamlined, so that the framed pieces of film were simply "slides" and the lantern used to project them was a "slide projector".

Home slide shows were a relatively common phenomenon in middle-class American homes during the 1950s and 1960s.

An image on 35 mm film mounted in a 2×2 inch (5×5 cm) metal, card or plastic frame is still by far the most common photographic slide format.

Uses
A well-organized slide show allows a presenter to fit visual images to an oral presentation. The old adage "A picture is worth a thousand words" holds true, in that a single image can save a presenter from speaking a paragraph of descriptive details. As with any public speaking or lecturing, a certain amount of talent, experience, and rehearsal is required to make a successful slide show presentation.

Presentation software is most commonly used in the business world, where millions of presentations are created daily. Another very important area where it is used is for instructional purposes, usually with the intention of creating a dynamic, audiovisual presentation. The relevant points to the entire presentation are put on slides, and accompany a spoken monologue.

Slide shows have artistic uses as well, such as being used as a screensaver, or to provide dynamic imagery for a museum presentation, for example, or in installation art. David Byrne, among others, has created PowerPoint art.

In art
Since the late 1960s, visual artists have used slide shows in museums and galleries as a device, either for presenting specific information about an action or research or as a phenomenological form in itself. According to the introduction of Slide Show, an exhibition organized at the Baltimore Museum of Art: “Through the simple technology of the slide projector and 35 mm color transparency, artists discovered a tool that enabled the transformation of space through the magnification of projected pictures, texts, and images.” Although some artists have not necessarily used 35 mm or color slides, and some, such as Robert Barry, have even abandoned images for texts, 35 mm color film slides are most commonly used. The images are sometimes accompanied by written text, either in the same slide or as an intertitle. Some artists, such as James Coleman and Robert Smithson, have used a voice-over with their slide presentations.

Slide shows have also been used by artists who use other media such as painting and sculpture to present their work publicly. In recent years there has been a growing use of the slide show by a younger generation of artists. The non-profit organization Slideluck Potshow holds slide show events globally, featuring works by amateur and professional artists, photographers, and gallerists. Participants in the event bring food, potluck style, and have a social dinner before the slide show begins.
 
Other known artists who have used slide shows in their work include Bas Jan Ader, Francis Alys, Jan Dibbets, Dan Graham, Rodney Graham, Nan Goldin, Louise Lawler, Ana Mendieta, Jonathan Monk, Dennis Oppenheim, Allan Sekula, Carey Young and Krzysztof Wodiczko.

Digital

Digital photo slide shows can be custom-made for clients from their photos, music, wedding invitations, birth announcements, or virtually any other scannable documents. Some producers call the resulting DVDs the new photomontage. Slide shows can be created not only on DVD, but also in HD video formats and as executable computer files. Photo slide show software has made it easy to create electronic digital slide shows, eliminating the need for expensive color reversal film and requiring only a digital camera and computer.

Photo slide show software often provides more options than simply showing the pictures. It is possible to add transitions, pan and zoom effects, video clips, background music, narration, captions, etc. By using computer software one therefore has the ability to enhance the presentation in a way that is not otherwise practical. The finished slide show can then be burned to a DVD, for use as a gift or for archiving, and later viewed using an ordinary DVD player.

Web-based slide show
A Web-based slide show is a slide show which can be played (viewed or presented) using a web browser. Some web based slide shows are generated from presentation software and may be difficult to change (usually unintentionally so). Others offer templates allowing the slide show to be easily edited and changed.

Compared to a fully fledged presentation program the web based slide shows are usually limited in features.

A web-based slide show is typically generated to or authored in HTML, JavaScript and CSS code (files).

See also
Photo slideshow software
Presentation software
Diaporama
Multi-image
Slide-tape
Filmstrip
LCD projector

References

Photography
Presentation